James W. Morgan (January 1843 – July 13, 1928) was an American politician in the state of Washington. He served in the Washington House of Representatives from 1895 to 1897.

References

Republican Party members of the Washington House of Representatives
1843 births
1928 deaths
People from Waitsburg, Washington